Teledyne DALSA (formerly DALSA Corporation) is a Canadian company specializing in the design and manufacture of specialized electronic imaging components (image sensors, cameras, frame grabbers, imaging software) as well as specialized semiconductor fabrication (MEMS, high voltage ASICs). Teledyne DALSA is part of the Teledyne Imaging group, the  leading-edge imaging companies aligned under the Teledyne umbrella.

History 
The company was founded in Waterloo, Ontario, Canada in 1980 by imaging pioneer Savvas Chamberlain, a former professor in electrical engineering at the University of Waterloo. The company was capitalised in November 1984 and was publicly listed on the Toronto Stock Exchange in May 1996. The company originally concentrated in developing and generating charge coupled device (CCD) image sensor technology. It has since grown into an industry leader in semiconductor technology, employing approximately 1000 individuals worldwide and earning revenues of more than $200 million.  Headquarters remain in Waterloo, Ontario, Canada, but the company has expanded operations into Billerica, Massachusetts; Santa Clara, California; Bromont and Montreal, Quebec; Eindhoven and Enschede, Netherlands, in addition to sales offices in Germany, Japan, and China. DALSA was acquired by Teledyne in 2010.

Technology and Applications 
Teledyne DALSA designs and manufactures digital imaging products for industrial, scientific, and medical applications, including semiconductor wafer inspection, printed circuit inspection, general machine vision, digital radiography, medium format photography, aerial photogrammetry, and astronomy. Notably, many of the image sensors employed in NASA’s Spirit, Opportunity, and Curiosity Mars Rovers were manufactured by Teledyne DALSA.

Teledyne DALSA is one of few industrial digital camera producers that has a vertically integrated supply chain. Teledyne DALSA owns the wafer forge where many of its imaging sensors are manufactured and is one of the few manufacturers offering both CCD and CMOS sensors. In 2005, Teledyne DALSA acquired Canadian frame grabber and camera manufacturer Coreco (based in Montreal). In doing so, Teledyne DALSA added software, acquisition and further gigabit Ethernet technology to its portfolio.  Teledyne DALSA developed a digital cinema camera (the Origin camera system), but despite remarkable imaging performance the system was not a commercial success and the project was wound down in 2009.

Recognition 
In 2007, Teledyne DALSA was named one of Canada's Top 100 Employers, as published in Maclean's magazine, one of a few manufacturing companies to receive this honour.

In 2010, Yole Développement named Teledyne DALSA’s wafer foundry as "the leading independent pure‐play MEMS foundry worldwide".

References

External links
Teledyne DALSA Website

1980 establishments in Ontario
2010 mergers and acquisitions
Canadian companies established in 1980
Canadian subsidiaries of foreign companies
Companies based in Waterloo, Ontario
Electronics companies of Canada
Electronics companies established in 1980
Film and video technology
Manufacturing companies of Canada
Semiconductor companies of Canada
Teledyne Technologies